Deer Mountain is the name of several landforms in the United States:
 Deer Mountain (Alaska) in Ketchikan Gateway Borough, Alaska
 Dear Mountain (California)
 Deer Mountain (Colorado)
 Deer Mountain (Nevada)
 Deer Mountain (New York)
 Deer Mountain (South Dakota)